Duffield is a surname in the United Kingdom, Australia, South Africa, Zimbabwe and the United States. The name Duffield is part of the legacy of Anglo-Saxon tribes of Great Britain.

History
Families began migrating abroad in enormous numbers during the political and religious discontent in England. Some of the first immigrants to cross the Atlantic and move to North America bore the name Duffield; e.g., John Duffield, a boy of 14, landed in Virginia, United States, in 1622. Benjamin Duffield made New Jersey his home in 1678. Over the next hundred years, the name Duffield was to be found in Philadelphia and other eastern seaboard cities.

Duffield is ranked 10,366 most common out of 88,799 surnames in the United States.

Notable people
 Alexander Duffield (1821–1890), English mining engineer, Hispanist and writer
 Andrew Duffield (born 1958), Australian musician
 Barry Duffield (born 1962), Australian actor, producer, scriptwriter and director
 D. Bethune Duffield (1821–1891), American poet and attorney
Brian Duffield, American screenwriter
 Burkely Duffield (born 1992), Canadian actor
 David Duffield (sports commentator) (1931–2016), British cyclist and TV commentator
 David Duffield (born 1941), American software businessman
 George Duffield (disambiguation), several people
 JaCorian Duffield (born 1992), American track and field athlete
 Jadey Duffield (born 1991), English actress, model and dancer
 John Duffield (born 1939), British financier
 Linda Duffield (born 1953), British diplomat
 Paul Duffield (born 1985), Australian rules footballer 
 Peter Duffield (born 1969), English professional footballer
 Richard Duffield (fl.1413–1435), English politician
 Robert Duffield (1935–2000), Australian journalist
 Rosie Duffield (born 1971), British politician
 Thomas Duffield (academic), Master of University College, Oxford 1396–98
 Thomas Duffield (died 1579), MP for East Grinstead, England
 Thomas Duffield (1782–1854), English farmer and politician
 Victoria Duffield (born 1995), Canadian singer, actress and dancer
 Dame Vivien Duffield (born 1946), British philanthropist
 Walter Duffield (1816–1882), British pastoralist and politician in South Australia
 William Duffield (painter) (1816–1863), British still-life painter
 William Ward Duffield (1823–1907), American coal industry executive, railroad construction engineer and army officer
 William E. Duffield (1922–2001), member of the Pennsylvania State Senate

See also
 Duffield (disambiguation)

References